The 1904 Villanova Wildcats football team represented the Villanova University during the 1904 college football season. Led by first-year head coach Fred Crolius, Villanova compiled a record of 4–2–1. The team's captain was Patrick O'Connor.

Schedule

References

Villanova
Villanova Wildcats football seasons
Villanova Wildcats football